Claus Washington Jungeblut (June 12, 1897 – February 1, 1976) was an American bacteriologist and vitamin researcher.

Biography

Jungeblut was born in Saint Paul, Minnesota to Nicholas and Gertrude Jungeblut. He was educated at University of Bern where he obtained his M.D. in 1921. He was an assistant at Robert Koch Institute (1921–1922).

He was a bacteriologist at the New York State Department of Health, an associate professor at Stanford University (1927–1929), and Professor of bacteriology at Columbia University (1929–1962). He was research consultant on microbiology at Lenox Hill Hospital (1962–1970).  He was known for his research on infantile paralysis.

Jungeblut married June Magor Beckwith in 1951.

Jungeblut died age 78 in Westport, Connecticut.

Vitamin C therapy

In the 1930s, Jungeblut conducted some of the first experiments on vitamin C therapy (megavitamin therapy). His experiments were done on monkeys infected with poliomyelitis. He concluded "that under certain restricted experimental conditions, vitamin C is capable of influencing favorably the course of the infection in monkeys." Albert Sabin was unable to replicate Jungeblut's results.

Selected publications

Inactivation of Poliomyelitis Virus in Vitro by Crystalline Vitamin C (Ascorbic Acid) (1935)
Vitamin C Therapy and Prophylaxis in Experimental Poliomyelitis (1937)
A Further Contribution to Vitamin C Therapy in Experimental Poliomyelitis (1939)
Studies on the Inactivation of Diphtheria Toxin by Vitamin C (I-Ascorbic Acid) (1941)

References

1897 births
1976 deaths
American bacteriologists
Columbia University faculty
Orthomolecular medicine advocates
People from Saint Paul, Minnesota
University of Bern alumni
Vitamin researchers